Rhododendron impeditum (粉紫杜鹃), the dwarf purple rhododendron, is a species of flowering plant in the family Ericaceae, native to southwestern Sichuan and northwest Yunnan in China, where it grows at altitudes of . The leaves are ovate, elliptic or broadly elliptic to oblong, 0.5–1.4 by 0.3–0.6 cm in size. The flowers are purple, violet, or rose-lavender, or rarely white.

References

 "Rhododendron impeditum", I. B. Balfour & W. W. Smith, Notes Roy. Bot. Gard. Edinburgh. 9: 239. 1916.

impeditum
Flora of China
Plants described in 1916
Taxa named by Isaac Bayley Balfour
Taxa named by William Wright Smith